The Governor of Yamalo-Nenets Autonomous Okrug is the head of government of Yamalo-Nenets Autonomous Okrug, a federal subject of Russia.

The position was introduced in 1991 as Head of Administration of Yamalo-Nenets Autonomous Okrug and was restyled in October 1995. The Governor is elected indirectly for a term of five years.

List of officeholders

References 

Politics of Yamalo-Nenets Autonomous Okrug
 
Yamal